Nayef Shindakh Thamer Al-Ghalbi (died 22 March 2003) was an Iraqi politician and a member of the Arab Socialist Ba'ath Party. He served as the official of the party's organizations in Salah al-Din Governorate. He also was a member of the Iraqi National Council as well as a party official in Najaf Governorate.

After the 2003 invasion
His name was included on the list of Iraqis wanted by the United States, but he is believed to have been killed during the invasion of Iraq, as the Iraq satellite channel broadcast a statement mourning him on March 22, 2003.

References

External links

2003 deaths
Members of the Regional Command of the Arab Socialist Ba'ath Party – Iraq Region